Gonadarche refers to the earliest gonadal changes of puberty. In response to pituitary gonadotropins, the ovaries in girls and the testes in boys begin to grow and increase the production of the sex steroids, especially estradiol and testosterone.

 In boys, testicular enlargement is the first physical sign of gonadarche, and usually of puberty.
 In girls, ovarian growth cannot be directly seen, so thelarche and growth acceleration are usually the first evidence of gonadarche.

Gonadarche should be contrasted with adrenarche. Gonadarche indicates that true central puberty has begun, while adrenarche is an independent maturational process only loosely associated with complete puberty.

References

Developmental biology
Developmental stages
Pediatrics
Sexuality and age
Puberty